Swinhoe's white-eye (Zosterops simplex) is a bird species in the white-eye family Zosteropidae. It is found in east China, Taiwan, north Vietnam, the Thai-Malay Peninsula, Sumatra and Borneo.

Taxonomy
Swinhoe's white-eye was formally described in 1861 by the English naturalist Robert Swinhoe and given the binomial name Zosterops simplex. The genus Zosterops had been introduced by the naturalists Nicholas Vigors and Thomas Horsfield in 1827. The genus name combines the Ancient Greek words zōstēros meaning "belt" or "girdle" and ōpos meaning "eye". The specific epithet simplex is Latin meaning "simple" or "plain".

This species was formerly treated as a subspecies group of the warbling white-eye (Zosterops japonicus) but based on the results of a molecular phylogenetic study published in 2018, it was promoted to species rank.

Five subspecies are recognised:
 Z. s. simplex R. Swinhoe, 1861 – east China, Taiwan and extreme northeast Vietnam
 Z. s. hainanus Hartert, 1923 – Hainan (off southeast China)
 Z. s. erwini (Chasen, 1935) – coastal Thai-Malay Peninsula, lowland Sumatra, Riau Islands, Bangka Island, Natuna Islands and lowland west Borneo
 Z. s. williamsoni Robinson & Kloss, 1919 – Gulf of Thailand coast and west Cambodia
 Z. s. salvadorii Meyer, AB & Wiglesworth, 1894 – Enggano Island (west Sumatra)

References

Swinhoe's white-eye
Birds of East Asia
Birds of Southeast Asia
Swinhoe's white-eye